Casal di Principe (Campanian:  or simply ) is a comune (municipality) in the Province of Caserta in the Italian region of Campania, located about  northwest of Naples and about  southwest of Caserta. It has a population of approximately 21,000 people. The town is located on the territory of Agro aversano - a rural area with 19 comunes spread on its land, and is directly linked to the comune of San Cipriano d'Aversa.

Casal di Principe is also known for the export of buffalo mozzarella and organised crime.

References

External links
 Official website

Cities and towns in Campania